Hossein Nassim (born 27 April 1952) is an Iranian swimmer. He who was a member of Iran national water polo teams participating in the 1976 Summer Olympics and 1970, 1974, and 1986 Asian Games, and won a gold medal in 1974. Nassim was known for his national records in the backstroke, and his contribution to the Iran men's national water polo team from the early 1970s through the late 1980s. Nassim immigrated to Germany in 1987, and is now a coach and instructor with swim clubs there.

Early life

Nassim was born in Abadan, Iran, to Ramezan Nassim Naseri and Farideh Hasson. His earliest influences were from his brother Bahman Nassim, whom was himself a water polo player for Iran men's national water polo team, and a record holder for the backstroke from the late 1950s into the early 1960s.  Hossein's earliest participation in swimming began with Club Paas in Abadan (for swimming and water polo), then to Jam Club (for swimming, water polo, and basketball), before moving onto the National Men's team of Iran in 1967, at the age of 15.  He was known for his strenuous training regimen of doing daily practices with both his swim team and water polo team, twice daily.

Water polo career

Hossein Nassim was known for his speed and strength, earning the nickname 'Shark from the South' from his teammates and competitors, due to his coming from Abadan (which is located in the south of Iran).  In joining the national men's team in 1967, he became a starting player for the team in 1970, with his first trip being to Romania for a competition.  During the 1974 Asian Games, held in Tehran, Iran, the national team was able to win the gold medal, with the finals being held against China, which ended in a 5–5 tie.  Hossein scored three goals in the game, playing from the striker position.  It was rumored that post victory over China, that Hossein had climbed the 10m meter diving board and jumped into the pool in celebration, yet it was later discovered that it was a fan by name of Hooshang Parvin that was responsible for the celebratory leap.

In the ensuing years that followed leading up to the Iranian Revolution in 1978 to 1979, the national team was hindered in being unable to host or attend any major competitions.  During the early 1980s, government policy limited what sports could be played, with swimming and water polo being nearly completely eliminated.  Iran was absent from Asian game appearances in 1978 and 1982, due to political and social turmoil.  At the 1986 Asian Games held in Seoul, South Korea, the Iran men's national water polo team participated and placed 4th, despite close to a decade of not playing within international competitions. Hossein Nassim and Ahmad Yaghouti were the only players to have participated both on the 1974 Asian games team, and the 1986 Asian games squad.

1974 Asian Games controversy

In the aftermath of the 1974 Asian games, Hossein was subject to a two-year ban from swimming.  The ban was given due to an altercation with a high-ranking official that told Hossein to clean up his overgrown beard and long hair so that he could be used for an Army water polo competitions. Hossein explained to the official that he was Darvish (Sufi), at which the official scoffed and insulted his religion.  At this point Hossein responded by throwing the official into the swimming pool they were standing next to.  Upon being banished from all swimming pools in all of Iran, Hossein moved to southern Iran to take up training in the Shatt al-Arab.  Out of sight of officials he trained in the dense and strong currents from September 1974, until March 1975, when the ban was lifted due to the national water polo team moving to join him there for training, along with widespread press coverage of his actions.

Media appearances

In 1974, Hossein was asked to appear on the popular night time show called "Mikhakeh Noghrei", starring Fereydoun Farrokhzad.  The show was famous for having performers and entertainers on, but never athletes.  Hossein appeared on the show shortly after the Iran men's national water polo team won the 1974 Asian games.  On his appearance he sang a very famous song by Gharibeh, originally done by Shahrokh.

Coaching career

Post immigration to Germany in 1987, Hossein focused on coaching both swimming and water polo teams at local sports club.  In 2000, he was offered the position as head coach for the Iran Men's water polo team, but negotiations were terminated and Hossein returned to Germany.  Iran in 2005 offered Hossein the position of head coach for the Iranian Youth Water Polo team, which he led to a gold medal in the Youth Asian Cup, in Thailand that same year.  He also served as an assistant coach for Iran Men's Water Polo team in 2005, serving under Neven Kovacevic, who was the head coach.

Personal life

Hossein Nassim is married to Regina Nassim, and they have a single son, Nick Nassim.  Hossein also has a son, Bobby Nassim, from a previous marriage in the 1980s while living in Iran.  Hossein is currently overseeing the training of his son Nick for swimming and water polo competitions in Germany.

Records

 1967 – 1978   National record holder for 100m backstroke (1:06.09 min) swimming in Iran 
 1967 – 1978   National record holder for 200m backstroke (2:32.00 min) swimming in Iran
 1979 – 1986   National record holder for 200m backstroke swimming in Iran
 1970 – 1980   National record holder for 50m front crawl (00:26.50 seconds) swimming in Iran

Regional swimming competitions

 4th place in 4 x 100 medley relay 1974 Asian Games, Tehran, Iran
 Gold medalist in 100m backstroke, 1976 Omran Cup in Izmir, Turkey (Turkey, Iran, Pakistan, India)
 Gold medalist in 200m backstroke, 1976 Omran Cup in Izmir, Turkey (Turkey, Iran, Pakistan, India)
 Gold medalist in 4 x 100 medley relay, 1976 Omran Cup in Izmir, Turkey (Turkey, Iran, Pakistan, India)

International water polo accomplishments

 1970  Team Member of Iran men's national water polo team, 1970 Asian Games held in Bangkok, Thailand
 1974  Team Member of Iran men's national water polo team, 1974 Asian Games held in Iran; Gold medal
 1975  Team Member of Iran men's national water polo team, 1975 World Aquatics Championships held in  Cali, Colombia
 1975  Team Member of Iran men's national water polo team,  African-Asian Cup, defeated Egypt to win the Cup for the competition
 1976  Team Member of Iran men's national water polo team, participated in the Olympic Games held in  Montreal, Quebec, Canada
 1986  Captain of Iran men's national water polo team, 1986 Asian Games in Seoul, South Korea; 4 Place finish

Quotes

"I strive to continue the Book (journey) that my brother Bahman started and never finished"  Hossein Nassim, September 1974

See also
Iran at the 1974 Asian Games
Iran at the 1986 Asian Games
Iran at the 1976 Summer Olympics
Water polo at the 1975 World Aquatics Championships – Men's tournament

References 

1952 births
Living people
People from Abadan, Iran
Iranian male water polo players
Water polo players at the 1976 Summer Olympics
Olympic water polo players of Iran
Asian Games gold medalists for Iran
Asian Games medalists in water polo
Water polo players at the 1970 Asian Games
Water polo players at the 1974 Asian Games
Water polo players at the 1986 Asian Games
Swimmers at the 1974 Asian Games
Medalists at the 1974 Asian Games
Sportspeople from Khuzestan province